Lake Mead National Recreation Area is a U.S. national recreation area in southeastern Nevada and northwestern Arizona. Operated by the National Park Service, Lake Mead NRA follows the Colorado River corridor from the westernmost boundary of Grand Canyon National Park to just north of the cities of Laughlin, Nevada and Bullhead City, Arizona. It includes all of the eponymous Lake Mead as well as the smaller Lake Mohave – reservoirs on the river created by Hoover Dam and Davis Dam, respectively – and the surrounding desert terrain and wilderness.

Formation of Lake Mead began in 1935, less than a year before Hoover Dam was completed. The area surrounding Lake Mead was protected a bird refuge in 1933, later established as the Boulder Dam Recreation Area in 1936 and the name was changed to Lake Mead National Recreation Area in 1947. In 1964, the area was expanded to include Lake Mohave and its surrounding area and became the first National Recreation Area to be designated as such by the U.S. Congress.

Amenities
Lake Mead NRA features water recreation, including boating, swimming, and fishing, on both lakes as well as the stretches of river between the lakes. It also features hiking trails and views of the surrounding desert landscape.  Three of the four desert ecosystems found in the United States — the Mojave Desert, the Great Basin Desert, and the Sonoran Desert — meet in Lake Mead NRA. Tours of Hoover Dam – administered by the U.S. Bureau of Reclamation – are also a major attraction within the recreation area.

About  of the recreation area are managed separately under the Grand Canyon-Parashant National Monument, established in 2000.

The ghost town of St. Thomas, Nevada is contained entirely within Lake Mead NRA. The town, once entirely submerged beneath Lake Mead, features a two-mile-long loop trail with interpretative signage. It is accessed near the Northshore Entrance Station, just south of Overton.

Wilderness areas
There are currently nine officially designated wilderness areas under the National Wilderness Preservation System lying within Lake Mead National Recreation Area. All are in the Nevada portion. Parts of some of these wildernesses (as indicated) lie outside Lake Mead NRA and are managed by the Bureau of Land Management:
 Black Canyon Wilderness (Nevada)
 Bridge Canyon Wilderness
 Eldorado Wilderness (partly BLM)
 Ireteba Peaks Wilderness (partly BLM)
 Jimbilnan Wilderness
 Muddy Mountains Wilderness (mostly BLM)
 Nellis Wash Wilderness
 Pinto Valley Wilderness
 Spirit Mountain Wilderness (partly BLM)

Park resources
 900 plant species
 500 animal species
 24 rare and threatened species
  The relict leopard frog (Lithobates onca) is now believed to survive only in this area.
 9 designated wilderness areas
 122,166 museum objects and archives
 1,347 recorded archeological sites
 23 historic structures
 8 listed National Register Properties
 2 Traditional Cultural Properties

Fish species
Lakes Mead and Mohave offer some of the country’s best sport fishing. The following species are found in both lakes:
 Largemouth Bass
 Striped Bass
 Crappie
 Rainbow Trout
 Catfish (Channel)
 Bluegill

Visitation

For 2012, with 6.3 million recreational visits, Lake Mead National Recreation Area was the 5th most visited national park.

References

External links

National Park Service: Lake Mead National Recreation Area
Bureau of Reclamation: Hoover Dam
Arizona Boating Locations Facilities Map
Arizona Fishing Locations Map
Where to Fish in Arizona Species Information
Arizona Lake Levels
Historic American Engineering Record (HAER) documentation:

 
1936 establishments in Arizona
1936 establishments in Nevada

National Park Service areas in Arizona
National Park Service areas in Nevada
National Park Service National Recreation Areas
Protected areas established in 1936
Protected areas of Clark County, Nevada
Protected areas of Mohave County, Arizona
Protected areas of the Mojave Desert
Protected areas on the Colorado River
Historic American Engineering Record in Nevada